Gonatista phryganoides is a species of praying mantis discovered in 1839.  According to an entomologist's account published in 1912:

See also
List of mantis species and genera

References

Insects described in 1839
Mantidae